Antonio Pacenza (March 18, 1928 – February 7, 1999) was an Argentine boxer who competed in the Light Heavyweight division during his career as an amateur.

He was born in Buenos Aires.

Amateur career

Pacenza was the Light Heavyweight Olympic Silver Medalist in 1952.

Pro career
Pacenza turned pro in 1953 and spent most of his career fighting in Argentina.  In late 1953 he was knocked out by Atilio Natalio Caraune, in a fight for the vacant Argentine (FAB) light heavyweight title, which was vacated by Amado Azar.  Caraune relinquished title without defending it on August 1, 1956.  Pacenza retired in 1956, having won 14, lost 4, and drawn 1.

References
 
 databaseOlympics

1928 births
1999 deaths
Boxers from Buenos Aires

Light-heavyweight boxers
Olympic boxers of Argentina
Boxers at the 1952 Summer Olympics
Olympic silver medalists for Argentina
Olympic medalists in boxing
Argentine male boxers
Burials at San José de Flores Cemetery
Medalists at the 1952 Summer Olympics